Fiona Mackenzie may refer to:

Fiona J. Mackenzie, Scottish Gaelic singer, from Dingwall, Scotland
Fiona Mackenzie, singer-songwriter from the Isle of Lewis, Scotland, former member of Seelyhoo 
Fiona McKenzie, tennis player, see 1967 Federation Cup (tennis)